Somewhere is the title of Eva Cassidy's seventh posthumous album and the fourth studio album, twelve years after her death in 1996. For the first time, it includes two songs written by Eva Cassidy herself.

Track listing

Personnel
Eva Cassidy - vocals, backup vocals, guitar
Chris Biondo - bass guitar, acoustic guitar, synthesizers, percussion
Keith Grimes - electric guitar
Lenny Williams - piano, organ, synthesizers, orchestra
Raice McLeod - drums, percussion
Dan Cassidy - violin
Blues Webb - drums, percussion
William "JuJu" House - drums
Chris Walker - trumpet
Jen Krupa - trombone
Leonie & Amba Tremain - backup vocals
Steve Lima - guitar, bass guitar, drums, Hammond organ
Rob Cooper - Dobro and electric lap steel guitar

Charts

The album been certified Gold in the UK.

References

External links
Liner notes

2008 albums
Eva Cassidy albums
Albums published posthumously